Li Shuang (born 27 June 1992) is a Chinese snowboarder. She represented China at the 2014 Winter Olympics in Sochi.

References

External links
 
 

1992 births
Living people
Chinese female snowboarders
Snowboarders at the 2014 Winter Olympics
Snowboarders at the 2018 Winter Olympics
Olympic snowboarders of China
Snowboarders at the 2017 Asian Winter Games
Universiade medalists in snowboarding
Universiade gold medalists for China
Competitors at the 2011 Winter Universiade
21st-century Chinese women